"Forever" is a song performed by Ukrainian singer Alekseev. It represented Belarus in the Eurovision Song Contest 2018. The song was released as a digital download on 10 January 2018 through Zion Music.

Eurovision Song Contest

The song competed in the first semi-final, held on 8 May 2018 in Lisbon, Portugal. It did not qualify for the grand final.

Track listing

Charts

Release history

References

2018 songs
Alekseev (singer) songs
Eurovision songs of 2018
Eurovision songs of Belarus
English-language Belarusian songs